St. Dunstan's Well Catchment is a Site of Special Scientific Interest, covering  near Stoke St Michael in the Mendip Hills, Somerset, England. The site was notified in 1967. It is of both geological and biological significance.

Formerly known as Stoke St Michael Slocker, it contains nine SSSI units consisting of rock and calcareous grassland.

Geological 

The caves at Fairy Cave Quarry were formed mainly by the erosive action of
water flowing beneath the water-table at considerable pressure (so called 'phreatic' development), but as the water table has fallen many of the caves now lie well above it and the system now contains a variety of cave formations (stalagmites, stalactites and calcite curtains) which in their extent and preservation are amongst the best in Britain. Shatter Cave and Withyhill Cave are generally considered to be amongst the finest decorated caves in Britain in terms of their sheer abundance of pure white and translucent calcite deposits.

Biological 
An area of nationally rare species-rich unimproved calcareous grassland of the Sheep's-fescue-Meadow Oat-grass type occurs in the field to the east of Stoke Lane Quarry.  Small numbers of greater horseshoe bat (Rhinolophus ferrumequinum), lesser horseshoe bat (Rhinolophus hipposideros) and Natterer's bat (Myotis nattereri) hibernate in the cave system.

References 

Caves of the Mendip Hills
Sites of Special Scientific Interest in Somerset
Geology of Somerset